William Aloysius Cunningham (July 30, 1894 – September 26, 1953), was a Major League Baseball player who played outfielder from -. He would play for the Boston Braves and New York Giants.

Cunningham's two-run single in the second inning of the 1922 World Series' final game sparked the Giants to a 5–3 victory over the New York Yankees at the Polo Grounds and the championship. A year later, a Cunningham hit in the final game of the 1923 World Series put the Giants on top, but the Yankees rallied to win it.

He played just four seasons in the majors overall, getting 270 hits in 945 at-bats and batting .286. He compiled 9 home runs and 112 RBI. In eight World Series games, he hit only .176 (3-17) with three RBI.

External links

1894 births
1953 deaths
Major League Baseball outfielders
Baseball players from California
New York Giants (NL) players
Boston Braves players
Portland Beavers players
Saint Mary's Gaels baseball players
Seattle Giants players
Oakland Oaks (baseball) players
Seattle Rainiers players
Sacramento Senators players
Amarillo Texans players
Des Moines Demons players
Seattle Indians players
People from Colusa, California